Illustrated Songs is the second studio album of singer-songwriter Gaby Moreno. The album was released independently on April 5, 2011, and includes 12 songs.

Track listing

References 

2011 albums
Gaby Moreno albums